Martha Friedlander  (19 February 1928 – 14 November 2016) was a British-New Zealand photographer. She emigrated to New Zealand in 1958, where she was known for photographing and documenting New Zealand's people, places and events, and was considered one of the country's best photographers.

Early life 
Friedlander was born on 19 February 1928 in the East End of London to Jewish immigrants from Kyiv, Ukraine. From the age of three she grew up in a Jewish orphanage in London with her sister Anne. She won a scholarship at the age of 14 and attended Camberwell School of Art, where she studied photography. From 1946 to 1957 she worked as an assistant to fashion photographers Douglas Glass, an expatriate New Zealander, and Gordon Crocker. She married Gerrard Friedlander, a New Zealander of German Jewish origin, in 1957 and emigrated to New Zealand with him in 1958. She became a naturalised New Zealander in 1977.

Career 
Friedlander's first impressions of New Zealand were of a strange country with different land, people and social customs from her previous experience. She felt constrained by what she saw as New Zealand's conservatism compared to the lifestyle she had enjoyed in London, and she began taking photographs to document and understand the country and people around her. She was particularly interested in people and social movements, especially protests and activism – one of the first photographs she took in New Zealand was in Auckland in 1960, of people protesting the New Zealand rugby team's tour of South Africa. The photograph was later purchased by the BBC and used in a television series on rugby.

Initially, the couple lived in Te Atatū South, and Friedlander worked as a dental assistant in her husband's dental practice. She joined the Titirangi Camera Club, and was encouraged by photographers Olaf Petersen, Steve Rumsey and Des Dubbelt, editor of the magazine Playdate, to pursue photography as a career, which she began to do in 1964. In 1972 her work became well known through her collaboration with social historian Michael King, photographing Maori women and their traditional moko tattoos. Friedlander considered this project the highlight of her career, and in 2010 she donated the series of 47 portraits to the national museum, Museum of New Zealand Te Papa Tongarewa.

Friedlander's photography career lasted over 40 years, during which time she photographed a diverse range of subjects, including famous and ordinary people, and rural and urban landscapes. Her work was published in books, magazines and newspapers such as Wine Review, New Zealand Listener and the British Journal of Photography. She held exhibitions at a number of galleries, including the Photographers' Gallery in London, the Wynyard Tavern in Auckland (1966) and the Waikato Art Museum (1975). In 2001, a retrospective exhibition of 150 of her photographs from 1957 to 1986 was held at the Auckland Art Gallery, followed by a tour of New Zealand galleries the following year.

Publications 
Friedlander's work was featured in the books Moko: Maori Tattooing in the 20th Century (1972) with Michael King; Larks in a Paradise (1974) with James McNeish;  Contemporary New Zealand Painters A–M (1980) with Jim and Mary Barr;  Pioneers of New Zealand Wine (2002) with Dick Scott; Marti Friedlander: Photographs (2001) with Ron Brownson and Marti Friedlander with Prof. Leonard Bell  (2009). The book Marti Friedlander: Photographs  was shortlisted at the 2001 Montana Book Awards.

In 2013 Friedlander published an autobiography, Self-Portrait, written with oral historian Hugo Manson.

Honours and recognition 

In the 1999 New Year Honours, she was appointed a Companion of the New Zealand Order of Merit, for services to photography, and in 2004 she was the subject of a documentary by Shirley Horrocks entitled Marti: the Passionate Eye. In 2007 the Arts Foundation of New Zealand launched the Marti Friedlander Photographic Award, presented every two years to an experienced photographer. In 2011 she received an Arts Foundation of New Zealand Icon Award. She was awarded an honorary Doctorate of Literature by the University of Auckland in 2016.

Personal life 
In October 2016, Friedlander revealed that she was suffering from late-stage breast cancer. She died at her home in Auckland on 14 November 2016 aged 88. She was a member of the New Zealand Labour Party and photographed Prime Minister Norman Kirk in 1969.

References

External links
 
 Auckland Art Gallery Toi o Tāmaki: works by Friedlander
 'Wonderland' article and statement
 Friedlander in the collection of the Museum of New Zealand Te Papa Tongarewa
An index of sale results and essays about Friedlander's work

1928 births
2016 deaths
English emigrants to New Zealand
English Jews
New Zealand Jews
New Zealand people of Russian-Jewish descent
New Zealand photographers
New Zealand women photographers
Naturalised citizens of New Zealand
Companions of the New Zealand Order of Merit
New Zealand autobiographers
Deaths from breast cancer
Deaths from cancer in New Zealand
Women autobiographers
Photographers from Auckland